Kansas's 29th Senate district is one of 40 districts in the Kansas Senate. It has been represented by Democrat Oletha Faust-Goudeau since 2009.

Geography
District 29 is based in northern and downtown Wichita in Sedgwick County, covering many of the city's most diverse neighborhoods.

The district is located entirely within Kansas's 4th congressional district, and overlaps with the 83rd, 84th, 86th, 89th, 91st, 92nd, and 103rd districts of the Kansas House of Representatives.

Recent election results

2020

2016

2012

Federal and statewide results in District 29

References

29
Sedgwick County, Kansas